Murgeni is a town in Vaslui County, Western Moldavia, Romania. It had a population of 7,119 in 2011 and acquired town status in 2003. The town administers six villages: Cârja, Floreni, Lățești, Sărățeni, Schineni, and Raiu.

Murgeni is located in the southeastern extremity of Vaslui County, on the right bank of the Prut River, which separates it from Moldova to the east. To the south is Galați County. 

The Murgeni train station serves the CFR  Rail Line 603, which joins Bârlad to Fălciu, further up on the Prut River.

At the 2011 census, 69.49% of residents were ethnic Romanians and 19.44% Roma.

See also
 List of towns in Romania with large Roma populations

References

Towns in Romania
Populated places in Vaslui County
Localities in Western Moldavia
Populated places on the Prut
Romani communities in Romania